Delfina Marie Trujillo Garcia (c. 1933-2019) was a Chicana activist in Colorado. She ran for Colorado State Representative under La Raza Unida Party. She was one of the Las Madres de la Casa Verde. She and her husband, Louie "Lugs" Garcia, were members of La Raza Unida Party, United Farm Workers, and Barrio Salado Association of Salt Creek. They were members of the Cinco de Mayo and Diez y Seis de Septiembre event planning committees. They were supporters of the Crusade for Justice and active with El Centro del Quinto Sol in Pueblo.

Early life
Trujillo was born around 1933.

Adult life 
After Trujillo married Louis "Lugs" Garcia on October 18, 1952 at Mt. Carmel Church in Pueblo the couple moved to Salt Creek in 1953 where his parents lived. The couple had five daughters and two sons, in addition to raising 54 foster children.

Lugs joined the Brown Berets in 1968, and the couple were local organizers for Cesar Chavez's United Farm Workers for the grape and lettuce boycotts.

They were part of the group that fought the contamination of Salt Creek by Colorado Fuel and Iron (CF&I). CF&I contaminated the Salt Creek by discharging its waste and turned the water black. Lugs formed the Barrio de Salado Improvement Association (BSIA) and the group worked with Pueblo County Legal Services for representation when working with the Salt Creek Water District board of directors. The Garcias' organizing and the threat of a lawsuit convinced the board of directors to contract to receive water from the St. Charles Mesa Association. The group was incorporated in May 1972 and they gained power over the Salt Creek community center. The BSIA and the Brown Berets organized neighborhood cleanups.

During the 1971 protest march from Pueblo to Denver, Garcia and her family were part of the support group who fed the walkers and drove supplies to them on the way.

Garcia ran for Colorado State Representative in 1972 on the La Raza Unida party ticket in the 42nd District.

During the 1972-1973 student walkouts, Garcia was a spokesperson for the organization Parents United for Reformed Education (PURE). These parents picketed the police department to object to police officers within schools and demanded the resignation of superintendent Lee Williamson. led by Gladys Vigil. 

The Garcias continued working with the Barrio Salão Improvement Association with Corky Gonzales in order to address necessary improvements to the neighborhood that the city was not providing. Lugs was president and Trujillo Garica was "kind of a" secretary and vice president. Corky Gonzales brought sports equipment and the Garcias supported after school activities and meals for the local kids. 

She was one of the members of the Casa Verde Mothers, and Las Mujeres de Bueno Representacion.

She was a lead plaintiff in the English Only Act lawsuit in Colorado, .

The family slowed down their participation in many organizations when she needed heart surgery.

The couple took over Busy Bee Cafe. The cafe relocated and renamed to La Nortenita.

Death and legacy 
Garcia died on December 15, 2019 at age 86.

See also
Brown Berets
Chicano Movement
Delano Grape Strike
Environmental racism
Hispanics and Latinos in Colorado
Salad Bowl strike
United Farm Workers

References

External links
Garcia Family Papers, 1963-2009
Delfina Garcia and Gloria Ramirez, Oral History Memoir of Salt Creek/Colorado Chicano Activism

1933 births
2019 deaths
Activists from Colorado
American people of Mexican descent
American civil rights activists